Michael Andrew Parker is a British physicist and is professor of high energy physics at the University of Cambridge. Parker attended Queen Elizabeth's Hospital, Bristol  and in 1978 graduated with a Class II degree in Natural Sciences from the University of Oxford, which he followed with a PhD from University College London. Parker was appointed head of the Cavendish Laboratory in 2013.
From July, Professor Parker will succeed Bridget Kendall as master of Peterhouse College.

References

External links
 Faculty website

British physicists
Scientists of the Cavendish Laboratory
Fellows of Peterhouse, Cambridge
Fellows of the Institute of Physics
Living people
Year of birth missing (living people)